Anton Oleksandrovych Velboi (born 9 June 2000), professionally known as Wellboy, is a Ukrainian singer and songwriter. He participated in the tenth season of the Ukrainian edition of The X Factor in the team of NK. In 2022, he was announced as one of the finalists of Vidbir 2022, competing with his song "Nozzy Bossy" and ultimately ending third.

References

Living people
2000 births
English-language singers from Ukraine
People from Sumy Oblast
Ukrainian pop singers
Ukrainian singer-songwriters
21st-century Ukrainian male singers